Solar Crusade, the follow-up to Chaos Control, is an on-rails FMV shoot 'em up designed and published by Infogrames Multimedia, created using Softimage 3D, and modeled on Silicon Graphics workstations hardware for the Windows 95 operating system and Phillips CD-i video game console. This was the last official released game on the CD-i in its lifetime and the only one released in 1999.

Reception

References

External links

 The CDi collective review

1996 video games
CD-i games
Windows games
Full motion video based games
Rail shooters
Video games developed in France